Cecilia Schelin Seidegård (born 18May 1954, in Stockholm as Irene Cecilia Schelin), is a Swedish biochemist who served as Governor of Gotland County from 2010 to 2018 (including a two year extension beyond December 2016).

Seidegård grew up in Visby. In her youth, she was active in the Free Students, a political party of a students' union. For 1981–82, she was vice-chairman of the Swedish National Union of Students.

She obtained a Ph.D. in biochemistry, and then worked in the pharmaceutical industry, particularly in the Astra Group, where she was director of research at AstraZeneca. In 2003–2004, she was CEO of Huddinge University Hospital AB, and in 2004–2007 she was Director of the merged Karolinska University Hospital. Since 2004 she has been Chairman of the Board of the Royal Institute of Technology. Since 2008, she has also been chairman of the Systembolaget. She was elected in 2007 as a member of the Royal Swedish Academy of Engineering Sciences. From 2010 to 2018 she was County Governor of Gotland and in 2019 she was appointed County Governor of Kalmar County for one year.

References

External links 
BusinessWeek profile

Living people
1954 births
Scientists from Stockholm
Governors of Gotland
Swedish biochemists
Women biochemists
Swedish women chemists
20th-century women scientists
Swedish women scientists
Women business executives
AstraZeneca people
Swedish women academics
Women county governors of Sweden
20th-century Swedish women